Bishop's Mills is a community in the municipality of North Grenville, United Counties of Leeds and Grenville, in eastern Ontario, Canada, approximately  south of Ottawa, south of Kemptville and east of Merrickville. An unincorporated place and Compact Rural Community, it has a population of about 135 and is the home of the Bishops Mills Natural History Centre.

The village name is derived from a grist mill and a saw mill built on a branch of the Rideau River, today called the North Branch of Kemptville Creek, by Chauncey Bishop (1796–1877) and his brother, Ira (1803–1883). Descended from Loyalists originally from Connecticut, Chauncey and Ira founded Bishop's Mills in the 1840s on land acquired from King's College, now the University of Toronto.  This land was part of Lot 2 and 3, 9th Concession of Oxford Township, Grenville County, in what was then known as Upper Canada. A surveyed village plan was registered in 1885.

References

Other map sources:

External links

 Tom Graham's Bishop's Mills website

Communities in Leeds and Grenville United Counties